The Nawash-Kinjoano Reservation was an Ottawa reservation located along the Maumee River in Northwestern Ohio until slightly after 1830.  

The reservation consisted of the villages of Nawash and Kinjoano on the north side of the Maumee.  There was also a village of Tontogany on the south side of the Maumee which was not part of the reservation but was inhabited by Ottawas as well.

The reservation essentially stretched from just west of Waterville, Ohio to slightly east of Prairie Damascus, Ohio.

The reservation was established in 1807 and dissolved in 1831.

Sources
Helen Hornbeck Tanner. Atlas of Great Lakes Indian History. (Norman: University of Oklahoma Press, 1987) p. 134, 165.

1807 establishments in Ohio
1831 disestablishments in the United States
History of Ohio
Former American Indian reservations in Ohio
Odawa